Telnice is a municipality and village in Ústí nad Labem District in the Ústí nad Labem Region of the Czech Republic. It has about 700 inhabitants.

Administrative parts
Villages of Liboňov and Varvažov are administrative parts of Telnice.

References

Villages in Ústí nad Labem District